Atopobacter is a Gram-positive, rod-shaped and facultatively anaerobic genus of bacteria from the family of Carnobacteriaceae with one known species (A. phocae). Atopobacter phocae has been isolated from common seals.

References

Lactobacillales
Monotypic bacteria genera
Bacteria genera